Jayanta "Jay" Bhattacharya (born 1968) is an Indian American professor of medicine, of Economics, and of Health Research Policy at Stanford University, and the director of Stanford's Center for Demography and Economics of Health and Aging. His research focuses on the economics of health care. 

Bhattacharya is opposed to lockdowns and mask mandates as a response to the COVID-19 pandemic. With Martin Kulldorff and Sunetra Gupta, he was a co-author in 2020 of the Great Barrington Declaration, which advocated lifting COVID-19 restrictions on lower-risk groups to develop herd immunity through infection, while promoting the false promise that vulnerable people could be protected from the virus. The declaration was criticized as being unethical and infeasible by Tedros Adhanom Ghebreyesus, the director-general of the World Health Organization.

Education 
Bhattacharya has four degrees from Stanford: a BA (Phi Beta Kappa), an AM, an MD, and a PhD in economics.

Career 
Bhattacharya is a professor of medicine at Stanford University, a professor by courtesy of economics at Stanford, a professor by courtesy in Stanford's Department of Health Research and Policy, a senior fellow at the Stanford Institute for Economic Policy Research, the director of Stanford's Center for Demography and Economics of Health and Aging, a senior fellow by courtesy at the Freeman Spogli Institute for International Studies, a research associate at Acumen LLC, and research associate at the National Bureau of Economic Research.

He researches the health and well-being of populations, with emphasis on the role of government programs, biomedical innovation, and economics.

From 2006 to 2008, he was a research fellow at the Hoover Institution. From 1998 to 2001, he was an economist at the RAND Corporation and a visiting assistant professor at the UCLA Department of Economics.

COVID-19 pandemic 

Bhattacharya was an early opponent of lockdowns in response to the COVID-19 pandemic, and questioned the severity of the virus.

On March 24, 2020, Bhattacharya co-wrote an opinion piece in The Wall Street Journal entitled "Is the Coronavirus as Deadly as They Say?", which argued there was little evidence to support shelter-in-place orders and quarantines of the COVID-19 pandemic in the United States. Bhattacharya was a lead author of a serology study released in April which suggested that as many as 80,000 residents of Santa Clara County, California might have already been infected with COVID-19. The study and conduct of the research drew wide criticism for statistical and methodological errors and apparent lack of disclosure of conflicts. The study was later revealed to have received undisclosed funding from JetBlue founder David Neeleman, according to an anonymous whistle blower.

He is a co-author of the Great Barrington Declaration, a proposal arguing for an alternative public health approach to dealing with COVID-19, through "focused protection" of the people most at risk. In it, Bhattacharya and the two other researchers called on governments to overturn their coronavirus strategies and to allow young and healthy people to return to normal life while protecting the most vulnerable. This would let the virus spread in low-risk groups, with the aim of achieving "herd immunity", which would result in enough of the population becoming resistant to the virus to quell the pandemic. The authors conceded that it was hard to protect older people in the community, but suggested individuals could shield themselves and that efforts to keep infections low "merely dragged matters out". Bhattacharya wrote the declaration with Martin Kulldorff, professor of medicine at Harvard Medical School, and Sunetra Gupta, professor of theoretical epidemiology at Oxford University. It was published on 5 October 2020.

In October 2020, the World Health Organization's Director General stated that pursuing herd immunity before vaccination would be "scientifically and ethically problematic", and "allowing a dangerous virus that we don’t fully understand to run free is simply unethical." Writing at Science-Based Medicine, David Gorski, Professor of Surgery at Wayne State University, argued that Gupta, Bhattacharya, and Kulldorff had either been "politically very naïve" in working on the declaration with the American Institute for Economic Research, or that the doctors were "motivated as much by ideology as their interpretation of COVID-19 public health science". Regardless, Gorski opined, the declaration provided a narrative of scientific division useful for political purposes. In an interview, Bhattacharya said he hoped the declaration would prompt a dialogue about the benefits and harms of public health interventions. In October 2020, Bhattacharya, Kulldorff and Gupta met with then-U.S. President Donald Trump's health officials about the declaration.

In March 2021, Bhattacharya called the COVID-19 lockdowns the "biggest public health mistake we've ever made" and argued that "The harm to people is catastrophic". In May 2021, Bhattacharya was called as an expert witness for ten applicants who filed a constitutional challenge against Manitoba's COVID-19 public health orders. The judge determined that the public health restrictions did not violate charter rights, noting that Bhattacharya's views were not supported by most scientific and medical experts. In April, Bhattacharya participated in Florida Governor Ron DeSantis' roundtable about "Big Tech censorship and the COVID-19 pandemic." In August, Bhattacharya provided testimony in defense of Florida's ban on mask mandates. He publicly opposed COVID-19 vaccine passports and mandates, although he called the vaccines successful. The judge ruled against the Florida ban and said that the state's medical experts "are in a distinct minority among doctors and scientists". In December, with Kulldorff and Scott Atlas, Bhattacharya helped found a program called Academy for Science and Freedom at Hillsdale College, a conservative Christian liberal arts school.

In a 2021 case about masks in Tennessee schools, the judge criticized Bhattacharya's testimony as "troubling and problematic", said Bhattacharya had oversimplified conclusions of a study, and said he "offered opinions regarding the pediatric effects of masks on children, a discipline on which he admitted he was not qualified to speak". He was also named a senior scholar at the Brownstone Institute, a new think tank launched by Jeffrey Tucker that published articles opposing various measures against COVID-19; Kulldorff and Gupta, his co-authors on the Great Barrington Declaration, have also had roles there.

In April 2022, Bhattacharya wrote that he experienced racist attacks and death threats during the pandemic. He alleged that "Big tech outlets like Facebook and Google" suppressed "our ideas, falsely deeming them 'misinformation'". He wrote that "I started getting calls from reporters asking me why I wanted to 'let the virus rip,' when I had proposed nothing of the sort." Also in April, in response to California proposing a bill that would discipline physicians for promoting or spreading false information about COVID-19, Bhattacharya said that the bill could turn "doctors into agents of state public health rather than advocates for their patients". In December 2022, Florida governor Ron DeSantis named Bhattacharya, Kulldorff and several others to his newly formed Public Health Integrity Committee to "offer critical assessments" of recommendations from federal health agencies.

According to a December 2022 release of the Twitter Files, Bhattacharya was placed on a Twitter "Trends blacklist" in August 2021 that prevented his tweets from showing up in trending topics searches. It appeared to coincide with his first tweet on the service, which advocated for the Great Barrington Declaration's herd immunity proposal.

Selected publications

References

External links
 

Living people
Indian epidemiologists
Indian economists
Stanford University School of Medicine alumni
Indian medical researchers
People from Kolkata
1968 births
Stanford University School of Medicine faculty
Indian emigrants to the United States